Usk is an unincorporated community in Pend Oreille County, Washington, United States. Usk has a post office with ZIP code 99180. It is near the Kalispel Indian Reservation. There is also a general store.

Usk was named for the River Usk in Wales around 1890.

References

Unincorporated communities in Pend Oreille County, Washington
Unincorporated communities in Washington (state)